Hirehadagalli  is a village in the southern state of Karnataka, India. It is located in the Hadagalli taluk of Bellary district in Karnataka.

Demographics
In 2001, Hirehadagalli had a population of 7841 with 3901 males and 3940 females.

See also
 Bellary
 Districts of Karnataka

References

External links
 http://Bellary.nic.in/

Villages in Bellary district